Sonia Silva (born December 28, 1950) is an American social worker and politician.

Born in Chicago, Illinois, Silva received her bachelor's degree in education from Northeastern Illinois University and her master's degree in public policy and urban planning from the University of Chicago. She was a social worker who helped provided day care for children. From 1997 to 2001, Silva served in the Illinois House of Representatives. Silva was involved with the Democratic Party.

Notes

1950 births
Living people
Politicians from Chicago
Northeastern Illinois University alumni
Hispanic and Latino American women in politics
University of Chicago alumni
American social workers
Women state legislators in Illinois
Democratic Party members of the Illinois House of Representatives
Hispanic and Latino American state legislators in Illinois
21st-century American women